County Antrim (named after the town of Antrim) is one of six counties of Northern Ireland and one of the thirty-two counties of Ireland. County Antrim has a population density of 203 people per square kilometre or 526 people per square mile. It is also one of the thirty-two traditional counties of Ireland, as well as part of the historic province of Ulster.

The Glens of Antrim offer isolated rugged landscapes, the Giant's Causeway is a unique landscape and a UNESCO World Heritage Site, Bushmills produces whiskey, and Portrush is a popular seaside resort and night-life area. The majority of Belfast, the capital city of Northern Ireland, is in County Antrim, with the remainder being in County Down.

According to the 2001 census, it is currently one of only two counties of the Island of Ireland in which a majority of the population are from a Protestant background. The other is County Down to the south.

Geography

A large portion of Antrim is hilly, especially in the east, where the highest elevations are attained. The range runs north and south, and, following this direction, the highest points are Knocklayd , Slieveanorra , Trostan , Slemish , Agnew's Hill  and Divis . The inland slope is gradual, but on the northern shore the range terminates in abrupt and almost perpendicular declivities, and here, consequently, some of the finest coast scenery in the world is found, widely differing, with its unbroken lines of cliffs, from the indented coast-line of the west. The most remarkable cliffs are those formed of perpendicular basaltic columns, extending for many miles, and most strikingly displayed in Fair Head and the celebrated Giant's Causeway. From the eastern coast the hills rise instantly but less abruptly, and the indentations are wider and deeper. On both coasts there are several resort towns, including Portrush (with well-known golf links), Portballintrae and Ballycastle; on the east Cushendun, Cushendall and Waterfoot on Red Bay, Carnlough and Glenarm, Larne on the Sea of Moyle, and Whitehead on Belfast Lough. All are somewhat exposed to the easterly winds prevalent in spring. The only island of size is the L-shaped Rathlin Island, off Ballycastle,  in total length by  maximum breadth,  from the coast, and of similar basaltic and limestone formation to that of the mainland. It is partially arable, and supports a small population. Islandmagee is a peninsula separating Larne Lough from the North Channel.

The valleys of the Bann and Lagan, with the intervening shores of Lough Neagh, form the fertile lowlands. These two rivers, both rising in County Down, are the only ones of importance. The latter flows to Belfast Lough, the former drains Lough Neagh, which is fed by a number of smaller streams. The fisheries of the Bann and of Lough Neagh (especially for salmon and eels) are of value both commercially and to sportsmen, the small town of Toome, at the outflow of the river, being the centre. Immediately below this point lies Lough Beg, the "Small Lake", about  lower than Lough Neagh.

Transport
County Antrim has a number of air, rail and sea links.

Air
Northern Ireland's main airport, Belfast International Airport, at Aldergrove is in County Antrim. Belfast International shares its runways with 38 Brigade Flying Station Aldergrove, which otherwise has its own facilities. It is the fifth-largest regional air cargo centre in the UK. There are regular services to Great Britain, Europe and North America.

The region is also served by George Best Belfast City Airport, a mile east of Belfast city centre on the County Down side of the city, which was renamed in 2006 in honour of footballer George Best.

Rail

The main Translink Northern Ireland Railways routes are the major line between Belfast, Antrim, Ballymena, Coleraine and Derry, Belfast to Carrickfergus and Larne, the port for Stranraer in Scotland and Coleraine to Portrush.

Sea
Two of Northern Ireland's main ports are in County Antrim, Larne and Belfast.

Ferries sail from Larne Harbour to destinations including Cairnryan in Scotland.

The Port of Belfast is Northern Ireland's principal maritime gateway, serving the Northern Ireland economy and increasingly that of the Republic of Ireland. It is a major centre of industry and commerce and has become established as the focus of logistics activity for Northern Ireland. Around two-thirds of Northern Ireland's seaborne trade, and a quarter of that for Ireland as a whole is handled at the port, which receives over 6,000 vessels each year.

Population
The population of County Antrim was 615,384 according to recent census information, making it the most populous county in Northern Ireland.

Irish language
Statistics for 2009–2010 show 1,832 students attending the twelve  (Irish language primary schools) and one  (Irish language secondary school).

Religion

County Antrim is one of two counties on the island in which the majority of people are Protestant, according to the 2001 census, the other being Down. The strong Presbyterian presence in the county is due largely to the county's historical links with lowland Scotlandwho came to Ireland during the Plantation of Ulster, when England Colonised Ireland. Protestants are the majority in most of the county, whilst Catholics are concentrated in the northeast; on the shore of Lough Neagh; and in Belfast, particularly the west of the city.

Administration
The county was administered by Antrim County Council from 1899 until the abolition of county councils in Northern Ireland in 1973. The traditional county town is Antrim. More recently, Ballymena was the seat of county government. From 1973 Northern Ireland was split into districts, which were redrawn in 2015. County Antrim is part of the following districts:
 Antrim and Newtownabbey
 Belfast
 Causeway Coast and Glens
 Mid and East Antrim
 Lisburn and Castlereagh
 Armagh City, Banbridge and Craigavon

The county contains within it the whole of five parliamentary constituencies:
 Belfast North
 Belfast West
 East Antrim
 North Antrim
 South Antrim

Parts of the following five parliamentary constituencies are also in County Antrim:
 Belfast East
 Belfast South
 East Londonderry
 Lagan Valley
 Upper Bann

Settlements

Cities
Places with official city status:
 Belfast
 Lisburn

Large towns
(population of 18,000 or more and under 75,000 at 2001 Census)
 Antrim
 Ballymena
 Carrickfergus
 Larne
 Newtownabbey

Medium towns
(population of 10,000 or more and under 18,000 at 2001 Census)
 none

Small towns

(Population of 4,500 or more and under 10,000 at 2001 Census)
 Ballycastle
 Ballyclare
 Ballymoney
 Greenisland
 Jordanstown
 Portrush
 Randalstown

Intermediate settlements
(population of 2,250 or more and under 4,500 at 2001 Census)
 Ahoghill
 Broughshane
 Crumlin
 Cullybackey
 Whitehead

Villages

(Population of 1,000 or more and under 2,250 at 2001 Census)
 Bushmills
 Carnlough
 Cloughmills
 Cogry & Kilbride
 Cushendall
 Doagh
 Dunloy
 Glenavy
 Kells
 Portglenone
 Templepatrick

Small villages or hamlets
(population of less than 1,000 at 2001 Census)
 Aghagallon
 Aghalee
 Aldergrove
 Armoy
 Ballintoy
 Ballycarry
 Ballyeaston
 Ballygalley
 Ballynure
 Boneybefore
 Cairncastle
 Carnalbanagh
 Cargan
 Cushendun
 Dervock
 Glenarm
 Glynn
 Loughguile
 Moss-Side
 Newtown Crommelin
 Parkgate
 Portballintrae
 Rasharkin
 Stranocum
 Toome

Subdivisions
Baronies

 Antrim Lower
 Antrim Upper
 Belfast Lower
 Belfast Upper
 Carrickfergus
 Cary
 Dunluce Lower
 Dunluce Upper
 Glenarm Lower
 Glenarm Upper
 Kilconway
 Massereene Lower
 Massereene Upper
 Toome Lower
 Toome Upper

Parishes

Townlands

History

At what date the county of Antrim was formed is not known, but it appears that a certain district bore this name before the reign of Edward II (early 14th century), and when the shiring of Ulster was undertaken by Sir John Perrot in the 16th century, Antrim and Down were already recognised divisions, in contradistinction to the remainder of the province. The earliest known inhabitants were Mesolithic hunter-gatherers of pre-Celtic origin, but the names of the townlands or subdivisions, supposed to have been made in the 13th century, are all of Celtic derivation.

In ancient times, Antrim was inhabited by a Celtic people called the Darini. In the early Middle Ages, southern County Antrim was part of the Kingdom of Ulidia, ruled by the Dál Fiatach clans Keenan and MacDonlevy/McDunlavey; the north was part of Dál Riada, which stretched into what is now western Scotland over the Irish Sea. Dál Riada was ruled by the O'Lynch clan, who were vassals of the Ulidians. Besides the Ulidians and Dál Riada, there were the Dál nAraide of lower County Antrim, and the Cruthin, who were pre-Gaelic Celts and probably related to the Picts of Britain. Between the 8th and 11th centuries Antrim was exposed to the inroads of the Vikings.

In the late 12th century Antrim became part of the Earldom of Ulster, conquered by Anglo-Norman invaders. A revival of Gaelic power followed the campaign of Edward Bruce in 1315, leaving Carrickfergus as the only significant English stronghold. In the late Middle Ages, Antrim was divided into three parts: northern Clandeboye, the Glynnes and the Route. The Cambro-Norman MacQuillans were powerful in the Route. A branch of the O'Neills of Tyrone migrated to Clandeboye in the 14th century, and ruled it for a time. Their family was called O'Neill Clannaboy. A Gallowglass sept, the MacDonnells, became the most powerful in the Glynnes in the 15th century.

During the Tudor era (16th century) numerous adventurers from Britain attempted to colonise the region; many Scots settled in Antrim around this time. In 1588 the Antrim coast was the scene of one of the 24 wrecks of the Spanish Armada in Ireland. The Spanish vessel La Girona was wrecked off Lacana Point, Giant's Causeway in 1588 with the loss of nearly 1,300 lives.

Antrim is divided into sixteen baronies. Lower Antrim, part of Lower Clandeboye, was settled by the sept O'Flynn/O'Lynn. Upper Antrim, part of Lower Clandeboye, was the home of the O'Keevans. Belfast was part of Lower Clandeboye and was held by the O'Neill-Clannaboys. Lower Belfast, Upper Belfast, and Carrickfergus were also part of Lower Clandeboye. Cary was part of the Glynnes; ruled originally by the O'Quinn sept, the MacDonnell galloglasses from Scotland took power here in the late Middle Ages and some of the O'Haras also migrated from Connaught. Upper and Lower Dunluce were part of the Route, and were ruled by the MacQuillans. Upper and Lower Glenarm was ruled by the O'Flynn/O'Lynn sept, considered part of the Glynns. In addition to that sept and that of O'Quinn, both of which were native, the Scottish Gallowglass septs of MacKeown, MacAlister, and MacGee, are found there. Kilconway was originally O'Flynn/O'Lynn territory, but was held by the MacQuillans as part of the Route, and later by the gallowglass sept of MacNeill. Lower Massereene was part of Lower Clandeboye and was ruled by the O'Flynns and the O'Heircs. Upper Massereene was part of Lower Clandeboye, ruled by the O'Heircs. Upper and Lower Toome, part of the Route, were O'Flynn/O'Lynn territory. Misc was first ruled by the MacQuillans. Later, the Scottish Gallowglass MacDonnells and MacAlisters invaded. The MacDonnells were a branch of the Scottish Clan MacDonald; the MacAlisters traced their origin back to the Irish Colla Uais, eldest of the Three Collas.

Islandmagee had, besides antiquarian remains, a notoriety as a home of witchcraft, and during the Irish Rebellion of 1641 was the scene of an act of reprisal (for the massacre of Protestants) against the Catholic population by the Scottish Covenanter soldiery of Carrickfergus.

In 1689 during the Williamite War in Ireland, County Antrim was a centre of Protestant resistance against the rule of the Catholic James II. During the developing crisis James' garrison at Carrickfergus successfully repulsed an attempt by local Protestants to storm it. After the advance of the Irish Army under Richard Hamilton, all of County Antrim was brought under Jacobite control. Later in the year a major expedition from England under Marshal Schomberg landed in Belfast Lough and successfully laid siege to Carrickfergus. Having captured most of the largest towns of the area, they then marched southwards towards Dundalk.

Historic monuments

The antiquities of the county consist of cairns, mounts or forts, remains of ecclesiastical and military structures, and round towers.

There are three round towers: one at Antrim, one at Armoy, and one on Ram's Island in Lough Neagh, only that at Antrim being perfect. There are some remains of the ecclesiastic establishments at Bonamargy, where the earls of Antrim are buried, Kells, Glenarm, Glynn, Muckamore and Whiteabbey.

The castle at Carrickfergus, dating from the Norman invasion of Ireland, is one of the best preserved medieval structures in Ireland. There are, however, remains of other ancient castles, as Olderfleet, Cam's, Shane's, Glenarm, Garron Tower, Red Bay, and Dunluce Castle, notable for its dramatic location on a rocky outcrop.

The principal cairns are: one on Colin mountain, near Lisburn; one on Slieve True, near Carrickfergus; and two on Colinward. The cromlechs most worthy of notice are: one near Cairngrainey, to the north-east of the old road from Belfast to Templepatrick; the large cromlech at Mount Druid, near Ballintoy; and one at the northern extremity of Islandmagee. The mounts, forts and entrenchments are very numerous.

The natural rock formations of Giant's Causeway on the Antrim coast are now designated a UNESCO World Heritage Site.

Saint Patrick
According to tradition Saint Patrick was a slave for seven years, near the hill of Slemish, until he escaped back to Great Britain.

Linen
Linen manufacturing was previously an important industry in the county. At the time Ireland produced a large amount of flax. Cotton-spinning by jennies was first introduced to Belfast by industrialists Robert Joy and Thomas M'Cabe in 1777; and twenty-three years later it was estimated that more than 27,000 people were employed in the industry within  of Belfast. Women were employed in the working of patterns on muslin.

Notable residents

 James Adair (1709–1783), explorer, trader, and historian
 William Aiken (1779–1831), founder of South Carolina Canal and Rail Road Company
 John Bodkin Adams (1899–1983), general practitioner born in Randalstown and suspected of killing 163 patients while practising in England
 Joey Dunlop, OBE (1952–2000), from Ballymoney, five-time World Motorcycle Champion
 William Magee Hunter (1834-1868), New Zealand soldier, born in County Antrim
 Sir John Jamison (1776–1844), physician and naval surgeon from Carrickfergus who became a constitutional reformer in New South Wales, Australia
 George Macartney, 1st Earl Macartney (1737–1806), from Ballymoney, first British Ambassador to China
 Eva McGown (1883–1972), chorister, pioneer, and hostess in Alaska
 John O'Kane Murray (1847–1885), physician and author
 James Nesbitt (b.1965), from Broughshane, lived near Coleraine, actor
 Liam Neeson (b.1952), from Ballymena, actor
 Geoff Wylie (b.1956), from Ballymena, darts player
 Tony McCoy (b.1974), from Moneyglass, jockey
 Hugh Boyle (1897–1986), from Dunloy, Catholic Bishop of Port Elizabeth and of Johannesburg
 General Sir James Steele (1894–1975), senior British Army officer who served in both World War I and World War II
 Wayne Boyd (b. 1990), racing driver
 Josh Rock (b. 2001), darts player

Flora and fauna
Records of the seaweeds of County Antrim were brought together and published in 1907 by J. Adams who notes that the list contains 211 species. Batter's list, of 1902, contained 747 species in his catalogue of British marine algae.

Of the freshwater algae there are 10 taxa in the Charophyta (Charales) recorded from Co. Antrim: Chara aspera var. aspera; Chara globularis var. globularis; Chara globularis var. virgata (Kütz.) R.D.; Chara vulgaris var. vulgaris; Chara vulgaris var. contraria (A. Braun ex Kütz.) J.A.Moore; Chara vulgaris var. longibracteata (Kütz.) J. Groves & Bullock-Webster; Chara vulgaris var. papillata Wallr. ex A. Braun; Nitella flexilis var. flexilis; Nitella translucens (Pers.) C.A. Ag. and Tolypella nidifica var. glomerata (Desv.) R.D. Wood.

Sport

See also
 Abbeys and priories in Northern Ireland (County Antrim)
 List of townlands in County Antrim
 List of civil parishes of County Antrim
 Lord Lieutenant of Antrim
 High Sheriff of Antrim

References

External links

 
 County Antrim on the interactive map of the counties of Great Britain and Ireland – Wikishire
 County Antrim in 1900
 The Northern Ireland Guide: For information and reviews for locals and tourists alike
 Local Antrim Guide

 
Antrim